The Supporting Ontario’s Recovery Act, 2020 (Bill 218, 2020) is a law in the province of Ontario that shielded organisations from lawsuits over their role in the spread of COVID-19 and banned city councils in the province from using ranked voting in municipal elections.

Background

COVID-19 pandemic in Ontario 
The COVID-19 pandemic in Ontario began in late January 2020, with a province-wide state of emergency being declared on March 17.

On 2 April 2020, Mike Farnworth, Minister of Public Safety and Solicitor General of British Columbia, issued a ministerial order protecting persons providing essential services from liability for damages relating to the spread of COVID-19. A number of American states had also implemented similar regulations.

In June 2020, it was reported that Ford's government was considering a law to give organisations immunity from lawsuits over the spread of COVID-19. The reports came as a number of class-action lawsuits had been launched in the province over deaths in long-term care homes. The lawsuits targeted a number of corporations who ran private long-term care in the province, including Revera Retirement Living, Sienna Senior Living, Chartwell, and Responsive Group Inc.

By October 2020, as the second wave of the pandemic was beginning to arrive, over 1900 people had died from COVID-19 in long-term care in Ontario.

Ranked ballots in Ontario 
A number of city councils in Ontario had announced plans to introduce ranked ballots as their voting system for future municipal elections. The city of London had already made the change, with ranked ballots being used during the 2018 London, Ontario municipal election. In 2018, the cities of Kingston and Cambridge had held referendums on adopting ranked ballots for the 2022 municipal elections, with both referendums returning majorities in favour of the change. A number of other cities, including Barrie, were considering holing referendums of their own in 2022.

Most provincial political parties, including Ford's Progressive Conservative Party, use ranked ballots for their leadership elections.

Summary  
The first part of the bill provided liability protection for organisations against COVID-19 exposure-related lawsuits, if the organisation made a good faith effort to act in accordance with public health guidelines and federal, provincial or municipal laws on the pandemic. Such organisations include healthcare institutions, retail, non-profits, as well as minor sports associations. An exception to the liability protection was included for cases of gross negligence.

The bill also contained an unrelated provision amending the Municipal Elections Act, 1996. The provision eliminated the framework for municipalities in Ontario to use ranked ballots in city council and mayoral elections, thus banning the voting system in Ontario municipal elections. Ontario municipalities would henceforth have to use the first-past-the-post electoral system.

Legislative history 
The bill was introduced to the Legislative Assembly in October 2020 by Attorney General Doug Downey. The bill was supported by the governing Progressive Conservative Party of Ontario and opposed by the Ontario New Democratic Party and the Green Party of Ontario.

It received royal assent from Lieutenant-Governor Elizabeth Dowdeswell on 20 November 2020.

Reactions to the COVID-19 liability protection measures 
The CBC named it as the most controversial law passed by Doug Ford's government in 2020.

Support 
The Ontario Long Term Care Association applauded the bill, with CEO Donna Duncan stating that "Liability protection is a necessary measure to stabilize and renew Ontario's entire long-term care sector. Without it, many insurance companies will cease coverage, as they have already begun to do, putting homes across the province at risk and jeopardizing their expansion and renewal." The Insurance Bureau of Canada also supported the bill.

Doug Ford defended his government's actions over long-term care during the pandemic and the passage of the bill, stating that "I’ve been out here just hammering the people that have been negligent in long-term care. I’ve been on these guys like an 800-pound gorilla," and calling for critics of the bill to "talk to their lawyer rather than just read the headlines."

Opposition 
The bill attracted heavy criticism, with relatives of victims of the pandemic arguing that it would make it impossible to hold the long-term care providers where many Ontarians died of COVID-19 accountable for those deaths.

The government also faced scrutiny over links between it and the for-profit long-term care industry. The Ontario Health Coalition announced that it would file a formal complaint to the province's integrity commissioner over the bill, calling for an investigation into donations made by the industry to the Progressive Conservative Party. The government was also accused of using the pandemic as a cover to pass omnibus legislation that would entrench the Progressive Conservative Party's interests, with Emmett Macfarlane, associate professor at the University of Waterloo, stating that "to the extent that they're using the pandemic as cover for these controversial initiatives, it just stinks to high heaven."

Reactions to the Municipal Elections Act changes 
The day after the government introduced the bill to the Legislative Assembly, a report from the Centre for Urban Policy and Local Governance at Western University was released finding that there had been a high level of public interest in the voting system in the 2018 London elections and that "London shows us that ranked balloting can be administered well, but that it takes extra effort and organization, at least the first time around."

Support 
Steve Clark, Minister for Municipal Affairs and Housing, defended the government's move to ban ranked ballots, stating that it ensured consistency between municipal, provincial, and federal electoral systems, and would save municipalities money. He further stated that "our new proposed changes would bring predictability to municipal elections, at a time when Ontarians are focused on their health and safety."

Opposition 
The move to ban ranked ballots was also met with heavy criticism, with critics stating that it undermined local democracy and came without consulting the public. Electoral reform advocacy group Fair Vote Canada released a statement saying that "too often, politicians will push for whatever system is in the best interest of their party, or to protect their own jobs. Today we see that since the Conservative Party supports first-past-the-post, every municipality in Ontario is now stuck with it."

After the bill passed third reading, Liberal MPP Mitzie Hunter announced she would introduce a private member’s bill seeking to overturn the ban on ranked ballots for municipal elections, stating that "municipalities govern many of the most immediate aspects of our lives, yet they are subject to interference by this premier repeatedly."

A number of Toronto city councillors denounced the move, including mayor John Tory, as the city was considering switching to ranked ballots for future municipal elections. In Kingston, Bryan Paterson, the city's mayor, stated that "in 2018 Kingston voted in favour of moving to a system of ranked ballots in 2022, and I believe their decision should be respected." The London City Council voted almost unanimously to request that the province exempt the city from the ban.

References

External links 
 Text of the Act in English

Ontario provincial legislation
2020 in Canadian law
2020 in Ontario
Municipal elections in Ontario
COVID-19 pandemic in Canada
Canadian law articles needing expert attention
Ontario articles needing expert attention
Electoral reform in Canada